Ivan Nikitich Smirnov (1881 – 25 August 1936) was a Russian Bolshevik revolutionary, Soviet politician and Communist Party functionary. A prominent member of the Left Opposition, he led a secret trotskyist opposition group in the Soviet Union during the Stalin period. He was arrested in 1933 and shot during the Great Purge.

Political life 
He was born in Gorodishche, Penza Governorate in a family of Russian ethnicity.

In 1899, Smirnov joined the Russian Social Democratic Labour Party and became a Bolshevik. He led Party activity in Moscow, Saint Petersburg, Vyshniy Volochok, Rostov, Kharkov, and Tomsk. Smirnov was subject to repeated arrests. In 1916, he was called up for army service in a reserve regiment in Tomsk. In 1917, he became a member of the executive committee of the Tomsk Soviet. In August of the same year, Smirnov was one of the organizers and managers of the Bolshevist publishing house "Volna" (Wave) in Moscow. He was a deputy of the Constituent Assembly. During the Russian Civil War, Smirnov was a member of the Revolutionary Military Council of the Eastern Front (August 1918–April 1919), and the 5th Army (April 1919–May 1920). Smirnov played a pivotal role in defeating the army of Alexander Kolchak during the war, and in the subsequent execution of Kolchak on 7 February 1920.

In 1920–1923, Smirnov was a member of the Executive Committee of the Russian Communist Party (Bolsheviks). At the same time, he chaired the Siberian Revolutionary Committee and was a member of the Siberian bureau of the Party. Smirnov is known to have had close ties with the Cheka and administered massacres of the rebellious peasants in Tyumen and the Altai Mountains. He was the one to organize the capture of General Roman Ungern. In 1921–1922, Smirnov was a secretary of the Petrograd Committee and Northwestern Bureau of the Executive Committee of the Party. He was the closest associate of Grigory Zinoviev. Smirnov took part in mass executions and deportations from Petrograd of people of the "exploiter class".

From April 1922 through July 1923, Smirnov was a member of the Presidium of the Supreme Soviet of the National Economy (ВСНХ) of the RSFSR; from September 1922 through May 1923, its deputy chairman. In July 1923, Smirnov was appointed People's Commissar for Soviet Postal Services and Telegraph.

In 1923, Smirnov became an active member of the Trotskyist opposition. In October 1923,  Smirnov signed "The Declaration of 46", which attacked by implication the influence of Joseph Stalin as General Secretary of the Party. After Lenin's death in 1924, Smirnov publicly demanded removal of Stalin as General Secretary, but Stalin kept his position. 

In 1927, Smirnov signed the "Declaration of the Eighty-three", another anti-Stalin manifesto. Stalin now moved against him. On 11 November 1927, Smirnov was removed from his Post and Telegraph position. A month later, he was expelled from the Party by the 15th Party Congress. On 31 December 1927, Smirnov was sentenced to three years of internal exile by the OGPU Board.

In October 1929, Smirnov "broke with Trotskyism" and was reinstated in the Party in May 1930. In 1929–1932, he was director of Saratovkombainstroy, the Combine harvester assembly plant in Saratov. In 1932, Smirnov was appointed head of the Department of Erection of New Buildings at the People's Commissariat of Heavy Industry.

Then on 14 January 1933, Smirnov was arrested, and a month later again expelled from the Party, accused of forming an "anti-party group" in order to remove Stalin. Historian Pierre Broué showed that by the end of 1932 Smirnov had joined a clandestine bloc which Trotsky characterized as an alliance to fight Stalinist repression.

On 14 April 1933, he was sentenced to five years in labor camps. While still incarcerated, Smirnov was brought as a defendant in the "United Anti-Soviet Trotskyite-Zinovievite Centre" case. He was sentenced to death on 24 August 1936, and executed the next day. Smirnov was rehabilitated in 1988.

References

External links 
 Short biography of Ivan Smirnov on spartacus-educational.com
 The Death of Ivan Nikitich Smirnov by Victor Serge on Marxists.org

1881 births
1936 deaths
People from Penza Oblast
People from Gorodishchensky Uyezd
Old Bolsheviks
Russian Constituent Assembly members
Central Committee of the Communist Party of the Soviet Union members
Russian Trotskyists
Soviet Trotskyists
Trial of the Sixteen (Great Purge)
Great Purge victims from Russia
Russian people executed by the Soviet Union
Soviet rehabilitations